Brough may mean or refer to an area, enclosure, round tower or outer wall of a feudal castle.

Places

England 
Brough, Cumbria, a village in Cumbria
Brough Castle
Brough-on-Noe, a hamlet in Derbyshire
Brough, East Riding of Yorkshire, a town
Brough Aerodrome, an aerodrome and former motor racing circuit nearby 
Brough with St Giles, a village and civil parish in North Yorkshire
Brough Hall
Brough, Nottinghamshire, a village on the Fosse Way
Middlesbrough, a town in North Yorkshire

Scotland 
Brough, Caithness, near Dunnet Head
Brough, Shetland
Brough, Yell, Shetland
Brough of Birsay, a tidal island and lighthouse, Orkney Islands

Other uses
Brough (surname)
Brough Motorcycles, made in England from 1908 to 1926
Brough Superior, a brand of English motorcycles and automobiles were made from 1919 to 1940

See also 
Broch (disambiguation)